The following is a list of county roads in Huron County, Ontario.

References
Official Road Map of Southern Ontario, Ontario Ministry of Transportation

See also
 List of York Regional Roads
 List of Simcoe County Roads

Huron
Transport in Huron County, Ontario